Pavel Vostřák (born December 8, 1972) is a Czech professional ice hockey player. He played with HC Plzeň in the Czech Extraliga during the 2010–11 Czech Extraliga season.

Vostřák previously played for HC Karlovy Vary, Jokerit, HC Dukla Jihlava, BK Mladá Boleslav, HC Košice, HC Ambri-Piotta and HC Kometa Brno.

He also played for the Lausitzer Füchse in the 2nd Ice Hockey Bundesliga in Germany.

References

External links 
 
 

1972 births
Living people
Czech ice hockey forwards
Deggendorfer SC players
HC Plzeň players
HC Karlovy Vary players
HC Košice players
BK Mladá Boleslav players
HC Dukla Jihlava players
HC Kometa Brno players
HC Ambrì-Piotta players
Neuchâtel Young Sprinters HC players
People from Vlašim
Sportspeople from the Central Bohemian Region
Czech expatriate ice hockey players in Slovakia
Czech expatriate ice hockey players in Germany
Czech expatriate ice hockey players in Finland
Stjernen Hockey players
Lausitzer Füchse players
Czech expatriate sportspeople in Norway
Czech expatriate sportspeople in Switzerland
Expatriate ice hockey players in Switzerland
Expatriate ice hockey players in Norway